Stanko "Špaco" Poklepović (19 April 1938 – 24 December 2018) was a Croatian professional football player and manager.

Poklepović managed a number of teams over 46 years, including Hajduk Split on four occasions. He was also the first manager to win the Croatian First Football League with Hajduk Split, in its inaugural season, in 1992.

He died on 24 December 2018, at Split Hospital, after a long battle with health issues, aged 80.

Playing career
Throughout his whole career, Poklepović played for RNK Split, between 1956 and 1976, and won the Yugoslav Second League twice, first in the 1956–57 (Zone I) season, and then after in the 1959–60 (West) season.

Coaching career
He made his impact in the 1984–85 Yugoslav First League as a manager of Hajduk Split when he took over the Yugoslav powerhouse at the time when a lot of important players left the club and a lot of young players like Asanović, Andrijašević and Španjić joined the club with no experience.
Poklepović almost won the league but finished 2nd because of match-fixing that was popular with other clubs in the league. Hajduk broke the record and scored 2 or more goals in every match that season.

In the 1985–86 UEFA Cup, Poklepović lead Hajduk to the quarter-finals. Poklepović won the first leg match against Waregem 1–0 on Poljud but he was then sacked from Hajduk for under-performing in the league so he didn't manage the second leg game against Waregem which Hajduk lost on penalties after a 0–1 defeat.

In 1991, he returned to Hajduk, winning the 1992 Prva HNL which was Poklepović's first league trophy in his career. In 1992, he took over the Croatia national football team, but after 4 games and only 1 win, he left the team.

In 1994, he went to manage the Iran national football team and Persepolis. He won the 1995–96 Azadegan League and the 1996–97 Azadegan League with Persepolis.

In 1998, he took over Osijek and won the 1998–99 Croatian Cup which is Osijek's first and only trophy till today. He also finished 4th in the Prva HNL the same season and secured a place in European competitions for Osijek. He returned again to Iran in 2005 and 2009, but unsuccessfully.

In February 2010, he returned to Hajduk Split for the third time. He won the 2009–10 Croatian Cup and finished 2nd in the Prva HNL the same season. He qualified with Hajduk for the 2010–11 UEFA Europa League after defeating Dinamo București and Unirea Urziceni in the qualifying rounds. In the 2010–11 Prva HNL, he controlled the 1st position for a while and became a favorite of the fans and the media. In the Europa League, he defeated Anderlecht 1–0 on Poljud, which was Hajduk's biggest European victory since the mid 1990s. After losing a cup game against Istra 1961 in the round of 16 and losing the 1st position in the league, he was sacked by Hajduk chairman Joško Svaguša on 27 October 2010.

In February 2015, five years later, Poklepović returned again to Hajduk Split for the fourth time in his career, but later in April, he was sacked because of underperforming in the league.

Quotes
Look at this, they call me funnel, then they said, the Špaco funnel. Go to hell you and that funnel. You don't know what is a funnel or what is a defense.
After being asked by a reporter to elaborate his defense tactics which Poklepović compared to a funnel

I asked Ahmad  what is a penetration and he looks at me confused. I elaborate to him that penetration is a process in which the male penis enters the female vagina, and when I asked him what is ecstasy, half of the dressing room started laughing on the floor. I am a coach that educates, I speak about everything, even sex.
When asked about Ahmad Sharbini's limited playing time

Excuse me?! Please don't ask me that! What bunker, we had 8 chances to score while they had 10. Where is the bunker there?! What are you talking about, you should quit journalism.
When accused by a reporter of using bunker tactics after winning the 2010 Croatian Cup against NK Šibenik

I feel great, mentally and physically. I may be too old for sex, but not for football.
After becoming manager of Hajduk Split for the fourth time in his career at the age of 77

In Croatian, there are no attributes which can describe the greatness of Hajduk Split. Hajduk is not only immortal, Hajduk is indestructible
When asked to describe what is Hajduk Split

Managerial statistics

Honours

Player
Split
Yugoslav Second League: 1956–57 (Zone I), 1959–60 (West)

Manager
Hajduk Split
Prva HNL: 1992
Croatian Cup: 2009–10
Croatian Supercup: 1992

Persepolis
Azadegan League (changed later to Persian Gulf Pro League): 1995–96, 1996–97

Osijek
Croatian Cup: 1998–99

References

External links
Stanko Poklepović profile at soccerway.com

1938 births
2018 deaths
Footballers from Split, Croatia
Association footballers not categorized by position
Yugoslav footballers
RNK Split players
Yugoslav football managers
RNK Split managers
HNK Hajduk Split managers
FK Budućnost Podgorica managers
FK Borac Banja Luka managers
APOEL FC managers
Yugoslav expatriate football managers
Expatriate football managers in Cyprus
Yugoslav expatriate sportspeople in Cyprus
Croatian football managers
NK GOŠK Dubrovnik managers
Iran national football team managers
Persepolis F.C. managers
NK Celje managers
NK Osijek managers
Ferencvárosi TC managers
Sepahan S.C. managers
Damash Gilan managers
Persian Gulf Pro League managers
Croatia national football team managers
Croatian expatriate football managers
Expatriate football managers in Iran
Croatian expatriate sportspeople in Iran
Expatriate football managers in Slovenia
Croatian expatriate sportspeople in Slovenia
Expatriate football managers in Hungary
Croatian expatriate sportspeople in Hungary
Deaths from kidney failure